Claire Smallwood is a freeskier as well as executive director and co-founder of SheJumps, a women's outdoor recreation-focused nonprofit organization facilitating the participation of women and girls in outdoor activities through free and low-cost outdoor education. Smallwood was born in Santa Fe, New Mexico to a family of ranchers, entrepreneurs, and farmers. She is a graduate of Lewis & Clark College in Portland, Oregon.

Smallwood founded SheJumps along with professional freeskier Lynsey Dyer and journalist Vanessa Pierce.

At its 2014 Women + Sports Summit, ESPNW awarded her a $10,000 Everyday Heroes grant in recognition of her work.

References 

Living people
Year of birth missing (living people)
Outdoor recreation in the United States
People from New Mexico
Organization founders
American freeskiers
Lewis & Clark College alumni